Green Township is one of the fifteen townships of Harrison County, Ohio, United States. As of the 2010 census the population was 1,887, of whom 937 lived in the unincorporated portion of the township.

Geography
Located in the eastern part of the county, it borders the following townships:
German Township - north
Wayne Township, Jefferson County - northeast
Smithfield Township, Jefferson County - southeast
Short Creek Township - south
Cadiz Township - southwest
Archer Township - northwest

The village of Hopedale is located in northeastern Green Township, and the unincorporated community of Pittsburgh Junction lies in the western part of the township.

Name and history
It is one of sixteen Green Townships statewide.

Government
The township is governed by a three-member board of trustees, who are elected in November of odd-numbered years to a four-year term beginning on the following January 1. Two are elected in the year after the presidential election and one is elected in the year before it. There is also an elected township fiscal officer, who serves a four-year term beginning on April 1 of the year after the election, which is held in November of the year before the presidential election. Vacancies in the fiscal officership or on the board of trustees are filled by the remaining trustees.

References

External links
County website

Townships in Harrison County, Ohio
Townships in Ohio